The term plate glass university or plateglass university refers to a group of universities in the United Kingdom established or promoted to university status in the 1960s. The original plate glass universities were established following decisions by the University Grants Committee (UGC) in the late 1950s and early 1960s, prior to the Robbins Report in 1963. However, the term has since expanded to encompass the institutions that became universities as a result of Robbins' recommendations.

Origin of terminology
The term plateglass was coined by Michael Beloff for a book he wrote about these universities, to reflect their modern architectural design which often contains wide expanses of plate glass in steel or concrete frames. This contrasted with the (largely Victorian) red brick universities and the very much older ancient universities.

Beloff applied the term specifically to the new creations of the 1960s, not including the institutions promoted from university colleges or colleges of advanced technology, or created by division of existing universities "as Durham shed Newcastle". All of the original plateglass universities were created de novo as universities.

Beloff's plateglass universities 
Beloff listed seven universities in his book. These were the seven universities approved by the UGC prior to the Robbins Report.

University of East Anglia (1963)
University of Essex (1964/5)
University of Kent at Canterbury (now known as the University of Kent) (1965)
University of Lancaster (now known as Lancaster University) (1964)
University of Sussex (1961)
University of Warwick (1965)
University of York (1963)

Naming
Unlike previous universities in the United Kingdom which were usually named after the city they were located in (for example the University of Cambridge in Cambridge), several of the new universities were named after the county or wider area they served. The universities founded in Colchester and Brighton were named after the counties they are located in (Essex and Sussex respectively), the university founded in Canterbury initially use a name that combined the county name (Kent) with the city and the university in Coventry, Warwickshire was named after the county town of Warwick. The university in Norwich, which is in the county of Norfolk, was instead named for the wider area of East Anglia which also includes Suffolk and Essex. The universities built in Lancashire and Yorkshire were located in the county towns of Lancaster and York respectively. There were universities within those counties (Manchester and Liverpool in Lancashire; Sheffield, Leeds and Hull in Yorkshire).

Since the passage of the Further and Higher Education Act 1992 several new universities and university colleges have been created within the same city as a plate-glass university and have been named after the city: Brighton, Canterbury Christ Church, Coventry, Norwich University of the Arts, Writtle and York St John.

Common references
Certain aspects of the design of these universities acknowledges the formation of the group; for example, at Sussex the first batches of student residences to be built were named after some of the other new universities, i.e. "Essex House", "Kent House", "Lancaster House", "Norwich House" (for UEA), and "York House".

Other universities sometimes referred to as plate glass universities

Research at the Department for Education in 2016 categorised universities into four age groups: ancient (pre-1800), red brick (1800–1960), plate glass (1960–1992), and post-1992.

The institutions that gained university status in the 1960–1992 plate glass period are listed below. Almost all of these were promoted to university status, rather than created as universities like the institutions in Beloff's original list; ten were previously colleges of advanced technology (CATs).

(Dates refer to the granting of university status, not to founding of the institution.)

Aston University (1966) – formerly Birmingham CAT
University of Bath (1966) – formerly Bristol College of Science and Technology
University of Bradford (1966) – formerly Bradford Institute of Technology
Brunel University (1966) – formerly Brunel CAT; renamed "Brunel University London" in 2014
University of Buckingham (1983) – formerly University College at Buckingham (from 1973)
City University, London (1966) – formerly Northampton CAT; became a college of the University of London and renamed "City, University of London" in 2016
Heriot-Watt University (1966) – formerly School of Arts of Edinburgh
Keele University (1962) – formerly North Staffordshire University College
Loughborough University (1966) – formerly Loughborough CAT
Newcastle University (1963) – formerly King's College, University of Durham
Open University (1969) – de novo creation as a distance-learning university
University of Salford (1967) – formerly Salford CAT
University of Dundee (1969) – formerly Queen's College Dundee, part of the University of St Andrews
University of Stirling (1967) – de novo creation as a university
University of Strathclyde (1964) – formerly the Royal College of Science and Technology
University of Surrey (1966) – formerly Battersea CAT
New University of Ulster (1968) – de novo creation as a university; merged with the older Magee University College in 1969; merged with Ulster Polytechnic and renamed "University of Ulster" in 1984

The DfE study classified higher education institutions (HEIs) according to "the length of time an HEI had been established", without a detailed definition of how this was determined Keele might thus be considered "Red Brick" under this classification as it entered the university sector (as a university college) prior to 1960), as might Newcastle and Dundee, which were colleges of the universities of Durham and St Andrews respectively. The definition might also include institutions and colleges of the University of London that became part of the university sector in that period but did not receive university status:
Cranfield Institute of Technology (1969) – formerly the College of Aeronautics; granted university status and renamed "Cranfield University" in 1993
 London Business School (1965) – established 1964, joined University of London 1965
 Royal College of Art (1967)

The Scottish universities from the 1960s (Heriot-Watt, Stirling, Strathclyde, Dundee and the Open University in Scotland) are also known as "chartered universities" as they were established, and are governed, by their royal charters.

Popular culture
Malcolm Bradbury's 1975 campus novel The History Man is set in the fictional plate glass University of Watermouth. External scenes of the TV series were filmed at Lancaster University.

See also 
 Ancient universities
 Armorial of UK universities
 List of universities in the UK
 Post-1992 university
 Red brick university

References

External links
Toynbee, Polly (2002-06-05) After the jubilation must come the reckoning, The Guardian
Anti-ageism Laws Will Be Good for All, The Guardian (2003)
Collini, Stefan (2003-11-06) HiEdBiz, London Review of Books, Vol. 25 No. 21, pp 3–9
Sheffield University Library Collection

Universities and colleges in the United Kingdom
Glass architecture
Colloquial terms for groups of universities and colleges
1950s in the United Kingdom
1960s in the United Kingdom
1970s in the United Kingdom
Modernist architecture in England
Modernist architecture in the United Kingdom